Semien is Amharic and Tigrinya for "north", and may refer to:

 Semien Mountains
 Semien province
 Kingdom of Semien, a historical political entity of the Beta Israel people
 Marcus Semien, American baseball player